Richard Wayne Ownbey (born October 20, 1957 in Corona, California) is a former Major League Baseball pitcher.

Amateur career
Ownbey attended Savanna High School in Anaheim, California but, standing only  and being only 16 years old as a senior, he failed to make the school's baseball team which featured players such as Glenn Hoffman and Marty Castillo. Ownbey entered the workforce after high school and began working at a lock factory for $5 per hour while pitching in an amateur baseball league. Against the advice of friends and family, he quit his job at the lock factory in order to play college baseball.

Professional career

Mets 
While pitching at Santa Ana, Ownbey drew the attention of the Pittsburgh Pirates, who drafted him in the fourth round of the 1979 Major League Baseball draft. However, he did not sign. A year later, the Mets drafted him in the thirteenth round. In his first season of professional ball, Ownbey was 9–1 with a 1.80 earned run average for the Lynchburg Mets and Jackson Mets.

Ownbey made his major league debut on August 17, 1982, at Riverfront Stadium  as the starting pitcher against the Cincinnati Reds. He gave up five runs in five innings pitched and took the loss. Ownbey was a combined 2–5 over his two seasons with the Mets before being traded with Neil Allen to the St. Louis Cardinals for Keith Hernandez on June 15, 1983.

Cardinals 
Ownbey went 7–5 with a 3.63 ERA for the Louisville Redbirds of the American Association his first season in the Cardinals' organization. , his first season in a Cardinals uniform, Ownbey went 0–3 with a 4.74 ERA in four starts.

Royals 
Plagued by injuries, he pitched only four innings for their double-A Southern League affiliate, the Memphis Chicks before calling it a career.

Career totals

References

External links

Major League Baseball pitchers
New York Mets players
St. Louis Cardinals players
Lynchburg Mets players
Jackson Mets players
Tidewater Tides players
Louisville Redbirds players
Memphis Chicks players
Baseball players from California
People from Corona, California
Santa Ana Dons baseball players
Sportspeople from Riverside County, California
1957 births
Living people